Andrew Mikhail (born July 30, 1988) is an American composer, producer, vocalist, guitarist, and owner-operator of Trve Media Music; best known as the guitarist of Serpents (US), Defiler, and as the former guitarist of Oceano.

He has been performing live since 2002 and started touring when he was 17. Since then, he has done multiple tours and has traveled to over 16 countries with various bands.

Band chronology
Oceano
Guitarist / Songwriter / Co-Producer · 2007 to 2010
Earache Records, Worldwide

Serpents
Vocalist, Guitarist, songwriter, Producer · Feb 2010 to present
Trve Media Music, Worldwide

Thick as Blood
Guitarist · 2010
Eulogy Records, U.S.

Legend
Touring Guitarist · 2010
Rise Records, U.S.

Straight Line Stitch
Touring Guitarist · 2012 to 2013
Koch Records/eOne Music, U.S.

Defiler
Touring Guitarist · Feb 2013 to present
Razor & Tie, U.S.

Discography

With Oceano
Depths (2009)

With Serpents
Self-Titled EP (2010)
Born of Isthar (2013)
Pestilence (2014)
Temet Nosce (2019)

References
Andrew Mikhail – Former Oceano Guitarist joins Thick As Blood
Straight Line Stitch Recruits Oceano Guitarist, Andrew Mikhail
Revolver Magazine article featuring Andrew Mikhail

1988 births
American male composers
21st-century American composers
American male singer-songwriters
Living people
Singers from Chicago
Guitarists from Chicago
American male guitarists
21st-century American singers
21st-century American guitarists
21st-century American male singers
Singer-songwriters from Illinois